Barry Ross Brown (born October 10, 1934, in Culver City, California) is an American former volleyball player who competed in the 1964 Summer Olympics.

References

1934 births
Living people
American men's volleyball players
Olympic volleyball players of the United States
Volleyball players at the 1964 Summer Olympics
People from Culver City, California
Volleyball players at the 1963 Pan American Games
Pan American Games silver medalists for the United States
Pan American Games medalists in volleyball
Medalists at the 1963 Pan American Games
Stanford Cardinal men's volleyball players